Angela Buxton (16 August 193414 August 2020) was a British tennis player. She won the women's doubles title at both the French Championships and Wimbledon in 1956 with her playing partner Althea Gibson.

Early life
Buxton was born in Liverpool on 16 August 1934, one of two children born to Harry and Violet (Greenberg) Buxton. Her grandparents on both sides were Jewish and had immigrated to England from Russia, fleeing from the pogroms in the early 1900s. She was raised partly in South Africa. Buxton's father owned a successful cinema chain in northwestern England, which allowed her to attend boarding school at Gloddaeth Hall. While there, a coach noticed her tennis ability and urged her to acquire more training.

Career
Buxton began playing tennis at a young age. After spending time undergoing training in London and Los Angeles, in 1954 she earned the British No. 4 ranking. Buxton then reached the 1955 Wimbledon singles quarterfinals and climbed to World No. 9 in the rankings. She played in Wightman Cup competition for the United Kingdom in 1954, 1955, and 1956.

Buxton had her most successful tennis year in 1956. She won the women's doubles title and reached the singles final at Wimbledon, the first Briton to do so in 17 years. She won the English Indoor and London Grass Court singles championships and the English Hard Court doubles crown (with Darlene Hard). At the French Championships, she reached the singles semifinals and won the women's doubles title with Althea Gibson, who was the first African-American champion. Buxton was ranked World No. 5 by World Tennis and World No. 6 by Lance Tingay.

Buxton also won the women's singles title at the 1953 Maccabiah Games in Israel.

After suffering a serious hand condition in late 1956 (tenosynovitis), Buxton was forced to retire following the 1957 season at the age of 22.

Buxton's Judaism played a role throughout her career. Her religious background prevented full acceptance within the tennis world from an early age. Regarding her experience at the Cumberland, an elite lawn tennis club in London, she said:

Buxton repeatedly was refused access to training facilities because of her ethnicity. From the mid-1950s, she was able to practise at the private indoor court of Simon Marks, the Jewish owner of department store chain Marks and Spencer, who had become aware of the difficulties which Buxton faced.

After Buxton won the women's doubles title at Wimbledon with an African-American partner Althea Gibson, one English newspaper reported the event with a story titled "Minorities Win". "It was in very small type", said Buxton, "lest anyone should see it". Contradictory information surrounds the issue why Buxton was never a member of the All England Lawn Tennis & Croquet Club in Wimbledon. In one interview she recalled that she herself had refused an offer of hononary membership to the club, whereas in another she stated she had not refused it. She was a guest of the club at the Championships in 2014 with seating in the Royal Box. On another occasion, Buxton claimed the reason for not being a member of the club was antisemitic prejudice. Buxton said in 2004: "I think the anti-Semitism is still there. The mere fact that I'm not a member is a full sentence that speaks for itself." The chairman of the club said he could not comment until he investigated further and it was reported in 2019 that the club explained that membership was a private matter and strongly refuted that race or religion play a factor.

In 2009, Buxton remarked that "I wish [tennis] still wasn't such an elite sport", Buxton said. "I wish we could bring it down to a common baseline. It's going that way. It's still not there."

Later life and legacy
Buxton was inducted into the International Jewish Sports Hall of Fame in 1981. In 2014, she was inducted into the National Jewish Sports Hall of Fame. In 2015, the Black Tennis Hall of Fame inducted Buxton, honoring her for her doubles partnership and friendship with Althea Gibson as well as her efforts to raise funds for the ailing Gibson near the end of her life.

Buxton wrote the tennis books Tackle Lawn Tennis This Way (1958), Starting Tennis (1975), and Winning Tennis: Doubles Tactics (1980).

Buxton founded the Angela Buxton Tennis Centre in Hampstead Garden Suburb. In later years, she divided her time between Altrincham and Florida, where she kept a winter home and regularly attended tournaments and mentored players. She died on 14 August 2020, two days short of her 86th birthday, at her home in Fort Lauderdale.

Grand Slam finals

Singles (1 runner-up)

Doubles (2 titles)

Grand Slam singles tournament timeline

See also
 List of select Jewish tennis players
 Performance timelines for all female tennis players who reached at least one Grand Slam final

References

External links
Jewish Sports bio
"Recalling a tennis pioneer: Angela Buxton pays a visit," 9/3/06

1934 births
2020 deaths
English female tennis players
English Jews
English people of Russian-Jewish descent
French Championships (tennis) champions
Jewish tennis players
Maccabiah Games gold medalists for Great Britain
Sportspeople from Liverpool
Maccabiah Games medalists in tennis
Competitors at the 1957 Maccabiah Games
Wimbledon champions (pre-Open Era)
Grand Slam (tennis) champions in women's doubles
British female tennis players
Tennis people from Merseyside